Bert Wynne (15 November 1889, Battersea, London – 14 November 1971, Yeovil, Somerset) was a British actor and film director.

Selected filmography
Director
 The Town of Crooked Ways (1920)
 The Manchester Man (1920)
 Little Meg's Children (1921)
 Jessica's First Prayer (1921)
 Handy Andy (1921)
 Belphegor the Mountebank (1921)
 The Call of the East (1922)

Actor
 The Heroine of Mons (1914)
 The Christian (1915)
 The Folly of Desire (1915)
 The Shulamite (1915)
 The Game of Liberty (1916)
 When Knights Were Bold (1916)
 The Manxman (1917)
 Justice (1917)
 Tom Jones (1917)
 God and the Man (1918)
 The Top Dog (1918)
 The Wages of Sin (1918)
 Peace, Perfect Peace (1918)
 My Sweetheart (1918)
 Fettered (1919)
 Not Guilty (1919)
 The Polar Star (1919)
 When It Was Dark (1919)
 Splendid Folly (1919)

References

External links

1889 births
1971 deaths
English male silent film actors
20th-century English male actors
English film directors
Male actors from London
People from Battersea
20th-century British male actors